Sumon Reza is a Bangladeshi footballer who plays as a forward. He currently plays for Bashundhara Kings in Bangladesh Premier League.

Club career

Air Force FC
In 2014, Sumon gave trial for Air Force football team in his own college ground. He got selected and started his professional career as a footballer. He also got job as a soldier in Bangladesh Air Force. He became popular in inter-services football tournaments. He played for Air Force team from 2015 to 2018.

Uttar Baridhara
Sumon joined Uttar Baridhara Club in 2015 ahead of second phase of 2015–16 Bangladesh Premier League. Jahangir Alam, a Uttar Baridhara club official, scouted Sumon from inter-services tournamen while he was playing for Air Force football team. He played 5 matches in his first BPL season, mostly as substitute. Uttar Baridhara suffered relegation in that season. 

Sumon missed the next season for a long-term injury. After recovery, he again signed with Uttar Baridhara to play 2018–19 Bangladesh Championship League and got captaincy of the team. He helped Uttar Baridhara to get promotion in BPL scoring 8 goals, which includes a hat-trick.

Bashundhara Kings
On 25 November 2021, Sumon joined defending league champions Bashundhara Kings.

International career 
In July 2020, Reza earned his first-ever national call by Jamie Day.

On 13 November 2020, Reza made his senior debut against Nepal in an international friendly.

International goals

Senior team
Scores and results list Bangladesh's goal tally first.

References 

1995 births
Living people
Bangladeshi footballers
Bangladesh international footballers
Association football forwards
Uttar Baridhara SC players
Bashundhara Kings players